For Sale by Owner is a 2009 horror film starring Scott Cooper and Rachel Nichols, with supporting performances by Tom Skerritt, Skeet Ulrich, Frankie Faison, and Kris Kristofferson.

Plot
Will Custis (Scott Cooper) purchases a beat up older home in Virginia. Originally intent on making the house a fixer-upper project for the summer, Custis soon learns that house is not at all what it seems to be, with mysteries such as the man who sold him the house, Ferlin Smith (Kris Kristofferson) dying several years earlier in a car accident, and what the owners are of the sounds he continues to hear outside.

Cast

References

External links
 

2009 films
American horror films
2009 horror films
2000s English-language films
2000s American films
English-language horror films